The 2020 Oregon State Beavers football team represented Oregon State University during the 2020 NCAA Division I FBS football season. They were led by third-year head coach Jonathan Smith. The team played their home games on campus at Reser Stadium in Corvallis, Oregon, as a member of the North Division of the Pac-12 Conference.

On August 11, the Pac-12 Conference initially canceled all fall sports competitions due to the COVID-19 pandemic.

On September 24, the conference announced that a six-game conference-only season would begin on November 6, with the Pac-12 Championship Game to be played December 18. Teams not selected for the championship game would be seeded to play a seventh game.

Previous season
The Beavers finished the 2019 season with a 5–7 record, 4–5 in Pac-12 play to finish in a three-way tie for second place in the North Division. This was the most wins for the program since the 2014 season, nearly clinching their first bowl appearance since 2013.

Preseason

Pac-12 media day

Pac-12 media poll
In the Pac-12 preseason media poll, Oregon State was voted to finish in last place in the North Division.

Schedule
Oregon State had games scheduled against Oklahoma State, Colorado State, and Portland State, but canceled these games on July 10 due to the Pac-12 Conference's decision to play a conference-only schedule due to the COVID-19 pandemic.

Game Summaries

Washington State

at Washington

California

Oregon

at Utah

Stanford

Rankings

Players drafted into the NFL

References

Oregon State
Oregon State Beavers football seasons
Oregon State Beavers football